Selaginella plana, commonly known as the Asian spikemoss, is a lycophyte native to tropical Asia.

Distribution
Selaginella plana occurs in tropical regions of Asia, including India, Indochina, and the Malay Archipelago. Native populations are also present in Tanzania. The species was introduced to Puerto Rico and Cuba.

References

External links
 
 

plana
Flora of Asia
Flora of Tanzania
Flora of Puerto Rico